The CaribbeanTales International Film Festival is an annual film festival, staged in Toronto, Ontario. The festival programs a lineup of films from Caribbean countries, as well as films from the Caribbean diaspora in Canada.

The festival was launched in 2006 by filmmaker Frances-Anne Solomon, through her CaribbeanTales Media Group production firm. In 2009, the festival also launched a separate sister event for youth films, staged during Black History Month. In 2013, it launched CaribbeanTales TV, a video on demand streaming service dedicated to Caribbean films.

The event is normally staged at Toronto's Royal Cinema. Due to the COVID-19 pandemic in Canada, the 2020 festival was staged online through CaribbeanTales TV.

The festival also sponsors an incubator program to fund film projects by emerging filmmakers within the Caribbean diaspora.

References

External links

Black Canadian film festivals
Film festivals in Toronto
Film festivals established in 2006
2006 establishments in Ontario